The slender tail hap (short for "haplochromine") (Buccochromis lepturus), is a species of fish in the, tribe Haplochromini part of the subfamily Pseudocrenilabrinae of the family Cichlidae.

It is endemic to Lake Malawi in East Africa.  Its natural habitat is freshwater lakes.

References

Fish of Malawi
Slender tail hap
Fish described in 1922
Taxonomy articles created by Polbot
Fish of Lake Malawi